Those Who Kill, distributed as Darkness: Those Who Kill in some regions, is a Danish crime thriller television series created by  and produced by Miso Film and Viaplay/Nordic Entertainment Group. It was released on Viaplay in the Nordic countries on 1 March 2019, and has since been broadcast/streamed in several other countries. The series revolves around criminal profiler Louise Bergstein's (Natalie Madueño) attempts to link unsolved murders. The series is a reboot of the crime thriller of the same name that was created by Elsebeth Egholm and aired on TV 2 in 2011. The second season has been sub-titled Blinded: Those Who Kill in some regions.

Plot

Season 1
After spending six months unsuccessfully trying to find 17-year old Julie Vinding (Alvilda Lyneborg Lassen), who went missing on her way home from a party in a Copenhagen suburb, detective Jan Michelson (Kenneth M. Christensen) is taken-off the case by his superiors who believe the girl is dead. Michelson continues to work on the case in his spare time and discovers the disappearance of Natasha, another 17-year old blonde girl, ten years earlier. He quickly finds Natasha's body in a lake and is re-instated on the case. Michelson's boss MT (Peter Mygind) brings in criminal profiler Louise Bergstein (Natalie Madueño) to assist in the investigation. When a third blonde girl, hotel worker Emma Holst (Tessa Hoder), is kidnapped, the investigators discover that they may be hunting a serial killer.

Season 2
After returning to Funen to see her mother's friend Alice Ejbye (Solbjørg Højfeldt), Bergstein is asked by Ejbye, who has terminal cancer, to investigate the unsolved murder of her son 18-year-old son Markus Ejbye (Vilmer Trier Brøgger) five years earlier. Bergstein soon finds similarities to unsolved murders of two other young men on the island, Kasper Larsen (Téo Lepetit) and Ricky Hansen (Peter Zandersen), that also occurred five years earlier. When a fifth young man, William Fjeldby (Oscar Dyekjær Giese), a friend of Markus Ejbye, is murdered in similar circumstances, she teams up with Karina Hørup (Helle Fagralid), the lead detective on the cases, to track down a serial killer who has resumed killing after a five-year hiatus.

Cast and characters

Season 1

 Kenneth M. Christensen as Jan Michelsen
 Natalie Madueño as Louise Bergstein
  as Stine Velin
  as Anders Kjeldsen
 Peter Mygind as Møller Thomsen "MT"
  as Dennis Højbjerg
  as Emma Holst
  as Gitte Hermansen
 Maibritt Saerens as Anette Karlslund
  as Bente Velin
 Peter Plaugborg as Mikkel Velin
  as Ole Velin
 Alvilda Lyneborg Lassen as Julie Vinding

Season 2

 Natalie Madueño as Louise Bergstein
 Tobias Santelmann as Peter Vinge
 Helle Fagralid as Karina Hørup
 Solbjørg Højfeldt as Alice Ejbye
  as Torben Vissinge
 Jens Andersen as Søren Dedenroth
 Louis Næss-Schmidt as Johannes Vinge
  as Masja Zelinsky
 Henrik Prip as Leif Halborg

Release
Season 1 was released in the Nordic countries on the Viaplay streaming service on 1 March 2019. NPO 3 started broadcasting season 1 in the Netherlands on 20 April 2019. In the UK BBC Four started broadcasting season 1 on 31 August 2019. In Australia season 1 premiered on SBS On Demand on 18 December 2019. In Germany it started streaming as Darkness – Schatten der Vergangenheit on the Joyn Plus+ service on 26 November 2019. In Spain Filmin started streaming season 1 as Darkness: La Huella del Crimen on 3 March 2020. Arte broadcast season 1 in September 2020 as Le Tueur de l'Ombre in France and Darkness – Schatten der Vergangenheit in Germany.

Season 2 started streaming on Viaplay on 28 March 2021. Sub-titled as Blinded: Those Who Kill, season 2 was broadcast as on BBC Four in the UK and streamed on Acorn TV in the US in May 2021. It is to be streamed on Joyn Plus+ in Germany from 17 June 2021.

Reception
The series was nominated for the Best TV Series (Årets tv-serie) award at the Danish Film Academy's 2020 Robert Awards. Tessa Hoder was nominated for the Best Danish Actor (Årets danske skuespiller) award at TV 2 Zulu's 2020 Zulu Awards.

References

External links
 
 
 
 

2010s Danish television series
2019 Danish television series debuts
Danish crime television series
Danish drama television series
Danish-language television shows
Television shows set in Denmark